Eddie Miller (October 7, 1895 Dumont, New Jersey – August 7, 1965 Philadelphia, Pennsylvania) was an American racecar driver.

He was also a garage owner, and a mentor and neighbor of Stuart Hilborn and worked with Hilborn to design and build Hilborn's first hot rod to race on the Southern California dry lakes.

Indy 500 results

References

Indianapolis 500 drivers
People from Dumont, New Jersey
1895 births
1965 deaths
Racing drivers from New Jersey
Sportspeople from Bergen County, New Jersey